Ruth Beitia Vila (born 1 April 1979) is a retired high jumper who was the 2016 Olympic champion in the women's high jump. She was also a politician in the Partido Popular and a member of the Parliament of Cantabria.

Biography
Beitia first broke the Spanish record in 1998, jumping 1.89 m. She raised the record progressively up to 2.02 m, the current Spanish record, which she achieved on 4 August 2007. She is the first, and thus far, only Spanish woman to have jumped higher than two metres.

Beitia's first senior international appearance was at the 2002 European Athletics Championships in Munich, where she finished 11th. At the 2003 World Championships in Paris, she also finished 11th. At the 2004 Athens Olympics she failed to reach the finals. In 2005, she won the silver medal at the 2005 European Indoor Championships in Madrid but at the world championships at Helsinki 2005 she failed to reach the finals. In 2006, she won the bronze medal at the World Indoor Athletics Championships in Moscow.

In 2009, she won the silver medal at the 2009 European Athletics Indoor Championships in Turin. At the 2009 World Championships in Athletics in Berlin, she placed fifth (fourth after competitor disqualification). In 2012, she won the gold medal at the European Championships in Helsinki and at the 2012 London Olympics she was fourth, after which she retired from competition.

After a few months, disappointed by her failure to win an Olympic medal, Beitia came back from retirement. She won the gold medal at the 2013 European Athletics Indoor Championships in Gothenburg. Then she would become European champion twice more, in 2014 at Zürich and in 2016 at Amsterdam. Finally, she won gold at the 2016 Rio de Janeiro Olympic Games, with a height of 1.97m. This was the lowest winning height at the Olympics since the 1980 Summer Olympic Games, when Italian Sara Simeoni also cleared 1.97m.

Beitia ended in 12th place in the 2017 World Championships in Athletics and received the IAAF Fair Play Award for her behaviour during the competition.

She announced her retirement from competition in October 2017, following a rheumatoid arthritis process.

In 2021, two years after the original bronze medalist Svetlana Shkolina of the 2012 Olympics from Russia had been disqualified for failing in doping test, Beitia was reallocated as the bronze medalist of that event.

Olympic results

Achievements

Personal Bests

Political career

In 2008, Beitia was named chair of the Regional Executive Committee of the local branch of the People's Party (PP), serving in that capacity until 2012.

In 2011, she was ninth on the closed list of the PP for the election to the Parliament of Cantabria; the PP won 20 seats and she was duly elected. During her first term, she was named First Parliamentary Secretary, presiding over committee meetings and other gatherings of leading parliamentary officials.

In the 2015 election, the PP lost its absolute majority and did not form the next government; however, she advanced her place on the list to sixth and was re-elected.

In September 2018, Beitia was appointed a member of the national PP's executive board by leader Pablo Casado, serving as Secretary of Sport.

In January 2019, the PP announced her advance on the list for the 2019 election to first place, thus becoming the party's candidate for President of Cantabria. Nevertheless, a few days after Beitia stepped down and informed Casado of her decision to "leave politics due to strictly personal and family reasons".

References

External links

Ruth Beitia Atletismo Pielagos

1979 births
Living people
Sportspeople from Santander, Spain
Athletes from Cantabria
Spanish female high jumpers
Athletes (track and field) at the 2004 Summer Olympics
Athletes (track and field) at the 2008 Summer Olympics
Olympic athletes of Spain
Athletes (track and field) at the 2012 Summer Olympics
Athletes (track and field) at the 2016 Summer Olympics
European Athletics Championships medalists
World Athletics Championships athletes for Spain
World Athletics Championships medalists
Olympic gold medalists for Spain
Olympic gold medalists in athletics (track and field)
Medalists at the 2016 Summer Olympics
Mediterranean Games gold medalists for Spain
Athletes (track and field) at the 2005 Mediterranean Games
Olympic female high jumpers
European Athlete of the Year winners
Members of the Parliament of Cantabria
Mediterranean Games medalists in athletics
Diamond League winners
People's Party (Spain) politicians